Tessaracoccus terricola is a Gram-positive, rod-shaped and non-motile bacterium from the genus of Tessaracoccus which has been isolated from soil which was contaminated with oil.

References 

Propionibacteriales
Bacteria described in 2018